Gemilang is an album released in 2005 by Jaclyn Victor, the first Malaysian Idol. This album has eleven tracks, including Tunggu Sekejap, When I Fall in Love and Gemilang, the three songs performed by Jaclyn Victor which eventually led to her winning the inaugural competition.

History
"Gemilang", the first track, was composed by Aubrey Suwito, an award-winning composer. After hitting the stores across Malaysia, Gemilang sold thousands of CDs, achieving gold status within days. This CD topped the charts of ERA fm, hitz.fm, and other local charts, surpassing those of many other famous local artists. The album has sold 20,000 copies to date.

Track listing

Additional information
Executive Producer: Gumilang Ramadhan
Recording Studios: Kenny Music Studio, Grooveworks Studio, Nearfield Studio of Red Room Studio, Babyboss Studio
Album Cover Design: Nizam (Ad.verse)

Awards 
Anugerah Industri Muzik 2005
Best Music Arrangement (Song: Gemilang)
Best New Artist
Best Pop Album
Best Album
Carta Hits 1 (2005)
Best Song for Gemilang
Best Showmanship
Anugerah Juara Lagu 2005
Overall winner, for Gemilang
Winner of the Ballad Category, Gemilang

References

2005 albums
Jaclyn Victor albums
Sony BMG albums
Malay-language albums